This article lists the results and fixtures for the Seychelles women's national football team.

Record per opponent
Key

The following table shows Seychelles' all-time official international record per opponent:

Last updated: Seychelles vs Papua New Guinea, 8 April 2022.

Results

2015

2021

2022

See also
 Seychelles national football team results

References

External links
 Seychelles results on The Roon Ba
 Seychelles results on Global Sports Archive

Results
2010s in Seychelles
2020s in Seychelles
Seychelles
results women's